Beata Margareta Kristina Söderbaum (5 September 1912 – 12 February 2001) was a Swedish-born German film actress, producer, and photographer. She performed in Nazi-era films made by a German state-controlled production company.

Early life

Söderbaum was born in Stockholm, Sweden; her father, Professor Henrik Gustaf Söderbaum (1862–1933), was the permanent secretary of the Royal Swedish Academy of Sciences.

After both her parents died shortly after one another, Söderbaum moved to Berlin and enrolled in a theatre school.

Career

Nazi era

Beginning in 1935, Söderbaum starred in a number of films with director Veit Harlan, whom she married in 1939.
Harlan and Söderbaum made ten films together for the then state-controlled film production company UFA until 1945.

According to film historian Antje Ascheid, Söderbaum is frequently identified as "most singularly representative of the Nazi ideal, as the quintessential Nazi star". As a beautiful Swedish blonde, Söderbaum had the baby-doll looks that epitomized the model Aryan woman. In fact, she had already played the role of the innocent Aryan in a number of feature films and was well known to German audiences. Her youth and beauty made her a symbol of health and purity and thus an exemplary specimen of the Nazi ideal of womanhood.

In a number of her films, she had been imperiled by the threat of rassenschande ("racial pollution"). Two such roles were Dorothea Sturm, the doomed heroine of the antisemitic historical melodrama Jud Süß, who commits suicide by drowning after being raped by the villain and Anna in Die goldene Stadt, a Sudeten German whose desire for the city (in defiance of blood and soil) and whose seduction by a Czech result in her drowning suicide. As a result of her watery fate in these two films, as well as a similar end in her debut in Harlan's 1938 film Jugend, she was given the mock honorary title Reichswasserleiche ("Drowned Corpse of the Reich").

Other roles included Elske in Die Reise nach Tilsit, the wholesome German wife whose husband betrays her with a Polish woman, but finally returns, repentant; Elisabeth in Immensee, who marries a rich landowner to forget her unrequited love, and in the end decides to remain faithful even after she is widowed and her lover returns; Aels in Opfergang, a woman who dies after her love affair; Luise Treskow in The Great King, a miller's daughter who encourages Frederick the Great; and Maria in Kolberg, a peasant girl who loyally supports the resistance to Napoleon and is the only survivor of her family.

Postwar

In the first few years after the war, Söderbaum was often heckled off the stage and even had rotten vegetables thrown at her. In subsequent years, she frequently expressed regret for her roles in anti-Semitic films.

After her husband was again permitted to direct films, Söderbaum played leading roles in a number of his films. These included Blue Hour (1952), The Prisoner of the Maharaja (1953), Betrayal of Germany (1954), and I Will Carry You on My Hands (1958). Their last joint project was a 1963 theater production of August Strindberg's A Dream Play in Aachen.

After Harlan's death in 1964, Söderbaum became a noted fashion photographer. In 1974, she took a role in Hans-Jürgen Syberberg's film Karl May. In 1983, she published her memoirs under the title Nichts bleibt immer so ("Nothing Stays That Way Forever"). In her later years, Söderbaum faded into obscurity but still took roles in three movies and the television series The Bergdoktor. Her last film was with Hugh Grant in the thriller Night Train to Venice in 1994. She died in 2001 in a nursing home in Hitzacker, Lower Saxony, Germany.

Filmography 

 The Song to Her (1934) as Guest at Rondo
 Uncle Bräsig (1936) as Minning
  (1938) as Ännchen
 Covered Tracks (1938) as Séraphine Lawrence
 The Immortal Heart (1939) as Ev Henlein
 The Journey to Tilsit (1939) as Elske Settegast
 Jud Süß (1940) as Dorothea Sturm
 The Great King (1942) as Luise Treskow
 The Golden City (1942) as Anna Jobst
 Immensee (1943) as Elisabeth Uhl
 Opfergang (1944) as Aels Flodéen
 Kolberg (1945) as Maria Werner
 Immortal Beloved (1951) as Katharina von Hollstein
 Hanna Amon (1951) as Hanna Amon
 The Blue Hour (1953) as Angelika
 Stars Over Colombo (1953) as Yrida
 The Prisoner of the Maharaja (1954) as Yrida
  (1955) as Katharina von Weber
 Two Hearts in May (1958) as Annemie Müller
 I'll Carry You in My Arms (1958) as Ines Thormälen
 Die blonde Frau des Maharadscha (1962) as Yrida
 Playgirl (1966) as Besucherin beim Sechs-Tage-Rennen (scenes deleted)
 Karl May (1974) as Emma May
 Let's Go Crazy (1988) as Comtessa
 Das bleibt das kommt nie wieder (1992)
 Der Bergdoktor (1993, TV Series) as Frau Landmann
 Night Train to Venice (Train to Hell) (1993) as Euphemia (final film role)

References

External links
 
 Photographs and bibliography

1912 births
2001 deaths
20th-century German actresses
20th-century memoirists
Actresses from Stockholm
German film actresses
German memoirists
Photographers from Berlin
Swedish emigrants to Germany
Swedish film actresses
Swedish memoirists
Swedish photographers
Volpi Cup for Best Actress winners
Women memoirists
20th-century Swedish women